Jelena Brooks (born April 28, 1989) is a Serbian professional women's basketball player for UNIQA Sopron. She also represents the Serbian national basketball team.

She formerly played for the WNBA's Washington Mystics. She was a second-leading scorer of 2012–13 EuroLeague Women.

International career
She represented Serbian national basketball team at the EuroBasket 2015 in Budapest where they won the gold medal, and qualified for the 2016 Olympics, first in the history for the Serbian team.

Achievements
Euroleague: 2010-11 runner-up with WBC Spartak Moscow Region
EuroCup: 2013-14 runner-up with Dynamo Kursk

Personal life
Her mother is Ljubica Milovanović, former basketball player, and her brother is Nenad, basketball coach.
She is married to David Brooks.

See also 
 List of Serbian WNBA players

References

External links
Jelena Milovanović at eurobasket.com
Jelena Milovanović at fiba.com
Jelena Milovanović at fibaeurope.com

1989 births
Living people
Basketball players at the 2016 Summer Olympics
Beşiktaş women's basketball players
European champions for Serbia
Medalists at the 2016 Summer Olympics
Olympic basketball players of Serbia
Olympic bronze medalists for Serbia
Olympic medalists in basketball
Power forwards (basketball)
Serbian expatriate basketball people in Hungary
Serbian expatriate basketball people in Poland
Serbian expatriate basketball people in Russia
Serbian expatriate basketball people in Spain
Serbian expatriate basketball people in Turkey
Serbian expatriate basketball people in the United States
Serbian women's basketball players
Sportspeople from Kragujevac
Washington Mystics draft picks
ŽKK Šumadija Kragujevac players
ŽKK Vojvodina players
Basketball players at the 2020 Summer Olympics